Hepatitis B virus X-interacting protein is a protein that in humans is encoded by the HBXIP gene.

This gene encodes a protein that specifically complexes with the C-terminus of hepatitis B virus X protein (HBx). The function of this protein is to negatively regulate HBx activity and thus to alter the replication life cycle of the virus.

Interactions 

HBXIP has been shown to interact with NCOA6.

References

Further reading 

 
 
 
 
 
 
 
 
 
 

Hepatitis B virus